Amar Muhsin (born 27 December 1997) is a professional footballer who plays for Helsingborgs IF in the Allsvenskan. Born in Sweden, he represents Iraq internationally.

Early life
Born in Gothenburg to an Iraqi father and a Bosnian mother, he dreamt of playing for IFK Göteborg as a child.

Club career
Muhsin started his senior career in the lower divisions, first with Gothenburg minnows Gunnilse IS and Utsiktens BK. He was picked up by second-tier Jönköpings Södra IF, but only got playing time in Skövde AIK and Assyriska IK. In 2022 he started the season for second-tier AFC Eskilstuna. On 11 August the same year he was bought by Helsingborgs IF in an effort to retain their Allsvenskan berth. His third goal in five matches came against IFK Göteborg. After four goals in six matches he hoped to save Helsingborg from relegation, and though his goal of playing on Sweden's highest level had been accomplished, this was "only a beginning".

International career
Muhsin is eligible to represent Sweden, Iraq and Bosnia and Herzegovina. He is eligible to represent Iraq through his father, who is from Kirkuk and while the Bosnian press picked up on Muhsin’s goalscoring form in the Allsvenskan, he had picked to represent Iraq in mid-2022 and began the procedures to gain Iraqi citizenship in order to be able to represent the national team. On 27 October 2022, the Iraqi FA confirmed that Muhsin had obtained his passport, and on 28 October 2022, he was selected by interim manager Radhi Shenaishil to the national team to face Mexico, Ecuador and Costa Rica in November as the respective nations prepare for their 2022 FIFA World Cup campaigns. He debuted with Iraq as a late substitute in a 4–0 friendly loss to Mexico on 9 November 2022.

References

1997 births
Living people
Sportspeople from Gothenburg
Iraqi footballers
Iraq international footballers
Swedish footballers
Iraqi people of Bosnia and Herzegovina descent
Swedish people of Iraqi descent
Swedish people of Bosnia and Herzegovina descent
Gunnilse IS players
Utsiktens BK players
Jönköpings Södra IF players
Skövde AIK players
Assyriska IK players
AFC Eskilstuna players
Helsingborgs IF players
Ettan Fotboll players
Superettan players
Allsvenskan players
Association football forwards